The 2016 general election in the Autonomous Region in Muslim Mindanao (ARMM) was held on May 9, 2016. This was the second ARMM election that was synchronized with the general elections in the Philippines.

The governor and vice governor are elected via first past the post system; they are elected separately and may come from different parties. Elections for the regional assembly are via plurality-at-large voting, with each assembly district (coextensive with legislative districts as used in House of Representatives elections) having three seats. A voter can vote for up to the three candidates, with the candidates with the three highest total number of votes being elected.

This was the last general election for the ARMM. The elections in May 2019 were superseded by the approval of the new autonomous region, the Bangsamoro, via a plebiscite in January and February 2019. ARMM itself dissolved on February 26, 2019 when the Bangsamoro Transition Authority took over from the ARMM. The winners of the 2016 election were given the option to opt in to join the Bangsamoro Transition Authority Parliament until their terms expired on June 30. All but one, Regional Governor Mujiv Hataman, opted in.

The first general election in the Bangsamoro shall be on 2025, after it was scheduled from 2022.

Results

Regional governor

Regional vice governor

Regional assembly

Summary

Basilan (Lone District)

|-
|colspan=5 bgcolor=black|

|-

Lanao del Sur

1st District

|-
|colspan=5 bgcolor=black|

|-

2nd District

|-
|colspan=5 bgcolor=black|

|-

Maguindanao

1st District

|-
|colspan=5 bgcolor=black|

|-

2nd District

|-
|colspan=5 bgcolor=black|

|-

Sulu

1st District

|-
|colspan=5 bgcolor=black|

|-

2nd District

|-
|colspan=5 bgcolor=black|

|-

Tawi-Tawi (Lone District)

|-
|colspan=5 bgcolor=black|

|-

2016 elections in the Philippines
2013